Matti Meriläinen (26 November 1889 - 9 September 1963) was a Finnish farmer and politician, born in Sotkamo. He was a member of the Parliament of Finland from 1945 to 1954 and again from 1958 to 1962, representing the Finnish People's Democratic League (SKDL).

References

1889 births
1963 deaths
People from Sotkamo
People from Oulu Province (Grand Duchy of Finland)
Finnish People's Democratic League politicians
Members of the Parliament of Finland (1945–48)
Members of the Parliament of Finland (1948–51)
Members of the Parliament of Finland (1951–54)
Members of the Parliament of Finland (1958–62)